The East Point Shopping Centre is located in the center of the East Saint John Shopping retail district of Saint John. East Point is the shopping destination of choice for a wide range of fashion, home improvement, and hospitality services and is home to most of the region's major anchor stores including Home Depot, Costco, Indigo, Sobeys, and Princess Auto. The McAllister Regional Retail Centre is a shopping mall in Atlantic Canada, and is located in the East Side of Saint John, New Brunswick, Canada.

See also
List of neighbourhoods in New Brunswick

References

External links
 East Point Shopping
 McAllister Place

Neighbourhoods in Saint John, New Brunswick
Shopping malls in New Brunswick
Power centres (retail) in Canada
Buildings and structures in Saint John, New Brunswick
Tourist attractions in Saint John, New Brunswick
Shopping districts and streets in Canada